Dr Williams' School was a school founded in Dolgellau in 1875. It opened its doors in 1878 and continued until it was closed in 1975.

Samuel Holland was actively involved in setting the school up and became its first Chairman of the Board of Governors. The first head was Eliza Ann Fewings who lead the school for the first ten years. She went on to found a school in Brisbane and returned to establish the first YMCA in Wales.

The site of the school is now occupied by Coleg Meirion-Dwyfor.

Notable people associated with Dr Williams School
 Bessie Craigmyle was a teacher here in the 1880s.
 Margaret Lloyd George was educated here.

Arms

References
6.  Dr Williams’ School Old Girls Association website a community       website where ex pupils can upload their memories of life at the school 

Defunct schools in Wales
Schools in Gwynedd